The Nathan's Famous International Hot Dog Eating Contest is an annual American hot dog competitive eating competition. It is held each year on July 4th at Nathan's Famous Corporation's original, and best-known restaurant at the corner of Surf and Stillwell Avenues in Coney Island, a  neighborhood of Brooklyn, New York City.

The contest has gained public attention in recent years due to the stardom of Takeru "The Tsunami" Kobayashi and Joey "Jaws" Chestnut. The defending men's champion is Chestnut, who ate 63 hot dogs in the 2022 contest. The defending women's champion is Miki Sudo, who ate 40 hot dogs in 2022.

Rules

Major League Eating (MLE), sanctioned by the International Federation of Competitive Eating (IFOCE), has sanctioned the event since 1997. Today, only entrants currently under contract by MLE can compete in the contest.

The field of about 20 contestants typically includes the following:

 the defending champion;
 winners of a regional qualifying contest for that season;
 individuals qualifying as one of two wildcards (highest two average qualifier scores without winning a single qualifier); and
 those invited by special invitation of the MLE.

The competitors stand on a raised platform behind a long table with drinks and Nathan's Famous hot dogs in buns. Most contestants have water on hand, but other kinds of drinks can and have been used. Condiments are allowed, but usually are not used. The hot dogs are allowed to cool slightly after grilling to prevent possible mouth burns. The contestant that consumes (and keeps down) the most hot dogs and buns (HDB) in ten minutes is declared the winner. The length of the contest has changed over the years, previously 12 minutes, and in some years, only three and a half minutes; since 2008, 10 minutes.

Spectators watch and cheer on the eaters from close proximity. A designated scorekeeper is paired with each contestant, flipping a number board (since 2020, adjusting the digital board) counting each hot dog consumed. Partially eaten hot dogs count and the granularity of measurement is eighths of a length. Hot dogs still in the mouth at the end of regulation count if they are subsequently swallowed. Yellow penalty cards can be issued for "messy eating," and red penalty cards can be issued for "reversal of fortune", which results in disqualification. If there is a tie, the contestants go to a 5-hot-dog eat-off to see who can eat that many the quickest. Further ties will result in a sudden-death eat-off of eating one more hot dog in the fastest time.

After the winner is declared, a plate showing the number of hot dogs eaten by the winner is brought out for photo opportunities.

Awards
The belt is of "unknown age and value" according to IFOCE co-founder George Shea and rests in the country of its owner. In 2011, Sonya Thomas won the inaugural women's competition and its "bejeweled" pink belt.

Various other prizes have been awarded over the years. For example, in 2004 Orbitz donated a travel package to the winner. Starting in 2007, cash prizes have been awarded to the top finishers.

History
The Nathan's Hot Dog Eating Contest has been held at the original location on Coney Island most years since about 1972, usually in conjunction with Independence Day. Nathan's promoter Mortimer "Morty" Matz claimed that on July 4, 1916, four immigrants held a hot dog eating contest at Nathan's Famous stand on Coney Island to settle an argument about who was the most patriotic. He also made the spurious claim that the contest has been held each year since then except 1941 ("as a protest to the war in Europe") and 1971 (as a protest to political unrest in the U.S.). A man by the name of Jim Mullen is said to have won the first contest, although accounts vary. One account describes Jimmy Durante (who was not an immigrant) as competing in that all-immigrant inaugural contest, which was judged by Eddie Cantor and Sophie Tucker. Another describes the event as beginning "in 1917, and pitted Mae West's father, Jack, against entertainer Eddie Cantor."

In 2010, however, promoter Matz admitted to having fabricated the legend of the 1916 start date with a man named Max Rosey in the early 1970s as part of a publicity stunt. The legend grew over the years, to the point where The New York Times and other publications were known to have repeatedly listed 1916 as the inaugural year, although no evidence of the contest exists. As Coney Island is often linked with recreational activities of the summer season, several early contests were held on other holidays associated with summer besides Independence Day; for example, multiple contests in the 1970s were scheduled on Memorial Day or Labor Day.

In the late 1990s and early 2000s, the competition was dominated by Japanese contestants, particularly Kobayashi, who won six consecutive contests from 2001 to 2006. In 2001, Kobayashi transformed the competition and the world of competitive eating by downing 50 hot dogs—smashing the previous record of 25.5. The Japanese eater introduced advanced eating and training techniques that shattered previous competitive eating world records. The rise in popularity of the event coincided with the surge in popularity of the worldwide competitive eating circuit.

On July 4, 2011, Sonya Thomas became the champion of the first Nathan's Hot Dog Eating Contest for Women. Previously, women and men had competed against each other, except for one Memorial Day competition held in 1975. Eating 40 hot dogs in 10 minutes, Thomas earned the inaugural Pepto-Bismol-sponsored pink belt and won $10,000.

In recent years, a considerable amount of pomp and circumstance have surrounded the days leading up to the event, which has become an annual spectacle of competitive entertainment. The event is presented on an extravagant stage complete with colorful live announcers and an overall party atmosphere. The day before the contest is a public weigh-in with the mayor of New York City. Some competitors don flamboyant costumes and/or makeup, while others may promote themselves with eating-related nicknames. On the morning of the event, they have a heralded arrival to Coney Island on the "bus of champions" and are called to the stage individually during introductions. In 2013, six-time defending champion Joey Chestnut was escorted to the stage in a sedan chair.

The competition draws many spectators and worldwide press coverage. In 2007, an estimated 50,000 came out to witness the event. In 2004 a three-story-high "Hot Dog Eating Wall of Fame" was erected at the site of the annual contest. The wall lists past winners, and has a digital clock which counts down the minutes until the next contest. Despite substantial damage suffered at Nathan's due to Hurricane Sandy in October 2012, the location was repaired, reopened, and the 2013 event was held as scheduled.

ESPN has long enjoyed solid ratings from its broadcast of the Hot Dog Eating Contest on Independence Day, and on July 1, 2014, the network announced it had extended its agreement with Major League Eating and will broadcast the contest through 2024. The event continues to be recognized for its power as a marketing tool.

In 2020, due to the COVID-19 pandemic, the contest was held without spectators at an indoor location in Williamsburg, Brooklyn, and only five eaters competed in each category instead of the usual 15.  In 2021, the event was held at Maimonides Park, with a reduced crowd of 7,000.

In 2003 former National Football League player William "The Refrigerator" Perry competed as a celebrity contestant. Though he had won a qualifier by eating twelve hot dogs, he ate only four at the contest, stopping after just five minutes. The celebrity contestant experiment has not been held since.

At the 2007 contest, the results were delayed to review whether defending champion Kobayashi had vomited (also known as a "Roman method incident" or "reversal of fortune") in the final seconds of regulation. Such an incident results in the disqualification of the competitor under the rules of the IFOCE. The judges ruled in Kobayashi's favor. A similar incident occurred involving Kobayashi in 2002 in a victory over Eric "Badlands" Booker.

Kobayashi has not competed in the contest since 2009 due to his refusal to sign an exclusive contract with Major League Eating, which is the current sanctioning body of the contest. In 2010, he was arrested by police after attempting to jump on the stage after the contest was over and disrupt the proceedings. Some witnesses reported that Kobayashi was attempting to congratulate the winner, Chestnut. On August 5, 2010, all charges against Kobayashi were dismissed by a judge in Brooklyn. Despite his six consecutive victories in their annual event, Nathan's removed Kobayashi's image from their "Wall of Fame" in 2011. Kobayashi again refused to compete in 2011, but instead conducted his own hot dog eating exhibition, consuming 69 HDB, seven more than Chestnut accomplished in the Nathan's contest. The sports website Deadspin deemed Kobayashi's solo appearance "an improbably perfect 'up yours' to the Nathan's hot dog eating contest."

Results

By year (color-coded by belt color)

 final total may have been affected by interruption from protestor though Walter Paul's 1967 feat is documented in multiple UPI press accounts from the time, he has also been mentioned in passing in more recent press accounts for supposedly establishing the contest's then-record 17 hot dogs consumed; several other people have similarly been credited for records of 13½, 17½, or 18½ hot dogs consumed; the following feats are not known to be documented more fully in press accounts from the time of their occurrence and, as such, may not be credible and are not included in the Results table above:

"Several years" before 1986: unspecified contestant, 13½
1979: unspecified contestant, 17½
1978: Walter Paul (described as being from Coney Island, Brooklyn), 17
1974: unspecified contestant, 16
1968: Walter Paul (described as "a rotund Coney Island carnival caretaker"), 17
1959: Peter Washburn (described as "a one-armed Brooklyn Carnival worker"), 18½ or 17
1959: Paul Washburn (described as a carnival worker from Brooklyn), 17½
1959: Walter Paul (described as a 260-pound man from Brooklyn), 17
1957: Paul Washburn, 17½

By Champion

 the 1974 Labor Day and 1978, 1979, 1980, and 1990 Independence Day competitions ended in ties

By Contest Type

 the 1974 Labor Day and 1978, 1979, 1980, and 1990 Independence Day competitions ended in ties

 prior to restructuring the competition to offer women's-only contests, the media was known to use the term "women's category" to describe female participation; the top-finishers of the "women's category" in this era included, for 2003: Sonya Thomas (25), 2004: Sonya Thomas (32), 2005: Sonya Thomas (37), 2006: Sonya Thomas (37), 2007: Sonya Thomas (39), 2008: Sonya Thomas (34), 2009: Sonya Thomas (41), and 2010: Sonya Thomas (36)

Media coverage

Live TV
In 2003, ESPN aired the contest for the first time on a tape-delayed basis. Starting in 2004, ESPN began airing the contest live. From 2005 to 2017, Paul Page was ESPN's play-by-play announcer for the event, accompanied by color commentator Richard Shea. In 2011, the women's competition was carried live on ESPN3, followed by the men's competition on ESPN. In 2012, ESPN signed an extension to carry the event through 2017. In 2014, ESPN signed an agreement to carry the competition on its networks for 10 years until 2024.

In 2021, Miki Sudo did not compete, as she was 37 weeks pregnant with her first child with fellow professional eater, Nick Wehry. Sudo instead served as an announcer, alongside Mike Golic Jr., Richard Shea, and Jason Fitz.

Film and TV programs 

The Nathan's contest has been featured in these documentaries and TV programs:

 "A Different Story" (July 4, 1996) – Jeannie Moos covers the contest on CNN
 "Red, White, and Yellow" (1998)
 "A Hot Dog Program: An All-American, Culinary Cruise Through Hot Dog History" (1999)
 "Gut Busters" (2002) Made for TV – Discovery Channel
 "Footlong" (2002) – not the 2003 short film of the same name
 "The Tsunami – Takeru Kobayashi" (2003) Japanese
 "Crazy Legs Conti: Zen and the Art of Competitive Eating" (2004)
 "The Most Extreme", "Big Mouths" episode (2004) (Animal Planet)
 Cheap Seats, (2004)
 "True Life" (2006) MTV documentary series
 Hungry (2013) documentary film; contract dispute between Nathan's Famous and Kobayashi
 "30 for 30: The Good, The Bad, The Hungry" (2019); ESPN Documentary

Newspapers
News sources typically use puns in head-lines and copy referring to the contest, such as "'Tsunami' is eating contest's top dog again," "couldn't cut the mustard" (A.P.), "Nathan's King ready, with relish" (Daily News) and "To be frank, Fridge faces a real hot-dog consumer" (ESPN).

Reporter Gersh Kuntzman of the New York Post has been covering the event since the early 1990s and has been a judge at the competition since 2000. Darren Rovell, of ESPN, has competed in a qualifier.

Tactics and training
Each contestant has his or her own eating method. Takeru Kobayashi pioneered the "Solomon Method" at his first competition in 2001. The Solomon method consists of breaking each hot dog in half, eating the two halves at once, and then eating the bun.

"Dunking" is the most prominent method used today. Because buns absorb water, many contestants dunk the buns in water and squeeze them to make them easier to swallow, and slide down the throat more efficiently.

Other methods used include the "Carlene Pop," where the competitor jumps up and down while eating, to force the food down to the stomach. "Buns & Roses" is a similar trick, but the eater sways from side to side instead. "Juliet-ing" is a cheating method in which players simply throw the hot dog buns over their shoulders.

Contestants train and prepare for the event in different ways. Some fast, others prefer liquid-only diets before the event. Takeru Kobayashi meditates, drinks water and eats cabbage, then fasts before the event. Several contestants, such as Ed "Cookie" Jarvis, aim to be "hungry, but not too hungry" and have a light breakfast the morning of the event.

See also

Glutton Bowl
Krystal Square Off
Horsemen of the Esophagus
Man v. Food
Wing Bowl

References

External links 

Two Dozen Hot Dogs Please, and No, They're Not to Go by Anthony Ramirez
Sports Illustrated feature on the 2006 contest
Interview of Melody Andorfer "Hot Dog Queen" and Winner of the 1972 Nathan's Hot Dog Eating Contest

Annual events in New York (state)
Competitions in the United States
Competitive eating
Coney Island
Culture of Brooklyn
Independence Day (United States)
Hot dogs
Recurring events established in 1916
Sports entertainment